Konkyan is a town in Konkyan Township, Shan State of Myanmar. It is also a part of Kokang Self-Administered Zone.

References

Populated places in Shan State